The 1990 FIFA World Cup qualification UEFA Group 1 was a UEFA qualifying group for the 1990 FIFA World Cup. The group comprised Bulgaria, Denmark, Greece and Romania.

The group was won by Romania, who qualified for the 1990 FIFA World Cup. Runners-up Denmark failed to qualify as their record was the worst of the runners-up from the groups containing only four teams.

Standings

Results

Goalscorers
There were 34 goals scored during the 12 games, an average of 2.83 goals per game.

5 goals

 Flemming Povlsen

3 goals

 Brian Laudrup

2 goals

 Kent Nielsen
 Gavril Balint
 Rodion Cămătaru
 Dorin Mateuţ
 Ioan Sabău

1 goal

 Kalin Bankov
 Bozhidar Iskrenov
 Trifon Ivanov
 Hristo Kolev
 Anyo Sadkov
 Hristo Stoichkov
 Henrik Andersen
 Jan Bartram
 Lars Elstrup
 Michael Laudrup
 Kim Vilfort
 Kostas Mavridis
 Tasos Mitropoulos
 Nikos Nioplias
 Gheorghe Hagi
 Gheorghe Popescu

1
1988–89 in Greek football
1989–90 in Greek football
1988–89 in Romanian football
Romania at the 1990 FIFA World Cup
1988–89 in Bulgarian football
1989–90 in Bulgarian football
1988 in Danish football
1989 in Danish football